Highway 48 (AR 48, Ark. 48, and Hwy. 48) is an east–west state highway in Southwest Arkansas. The route of  begins at Highway 9 south of Tulip and runs east to US Highway 167 (US 167) at Ferindale. The route is maintained by the Arkansas State Highway and Transportation Department (AHTD).

Route description
The route begins in northern Dallas County south of Tulip and serves as a lightly-used connection between Highway 9 and US 167, two primary north-south highways in the region. Highway 48 begins at Highway  and runs east to Carthage, where it intersects Highway 229, which heads south to Fordyce. Highway 48 and Highway 229 briefly concur eastward until Highway 229 turns north toward Leola. Heading east, the route leaves the city limits and runs through pine forests typical of the Arkansas Timberlands and the Hampton Springs Cemetery, listed on the National Register of Historic Places. Continuing east, Highway 48 terminates at an intersection with US 167 near the Grant County line.

History
Highway 48 was created during the 1926 Arkansas state highway numbering as a route between State Road 9 and US 167. The route has not been altered since creation.

Major intersections

See also

References

External links

048
Transportation in Dallas County, Arkansas